Jakub Michlík (born 9 October 1997) is a Slovak professional footballer who plays for Púchov as a midfielder.

Club career

MŠK Žilina
He made his Fortuna Liga debut for Žilina against Ružomberok on 7 November 2015.

References

External links
 MŠK Žilina official profile
 Futbalnet profile
 

1997 births
Living people
Sportspeople from Žilina
Slovak footballers
Slovak expatriate footballers
Slovakia youth international footballers
Association football midfielders
MŠK Žilina players
Olympia Radotín players
MŠK Púchov players
FK Slavoj Trebišov players
Slovak Super Liga players
2. Liga (Slovakia) players
Czech National Football League players
Expatriate footballers in the Czech Republic
Slovak expatriate sportspeople in the Czech Republic